In Whyte notation for the classification of steam locomotives by wheel arrangement, a 2-12-4 is a locomotive with one pair of unpowered leading wheels, followed by six pairs of powered driving wheels, and two pairs of unpowered trailing wheels.

Other equivalent classifications are:
 UIC classification: 1′F2′ (also known as German classification and Italian classification)
 European classification: 1-6-2
 French classification: 162

Bulgaria
There are only 20 standard gauge engines with this wheel arrangement that were built for and ran in Europe: class 46 of the Bulgarian State Railways (BDŽ). They were ordered by BDŽ and built according to its specification by two different manufacturers: 12 engines by H. Cegielski in Poznań, Poland in 1931, and 8 by Berliner Maschinenbau (Schwarzkopf) in Berlin, Germany in 1943. Although there is a major difference between the two batches—the first 12 engines are type 1′F2′ h2Gt — tank-engine for freight service, two-cylinder system with simple steam expansion (Zwilling) with superheating, while the remaining 8 are 1′F2′ h3Gt — 3-cylinder (Drilling)—all were put into the same class 46 and numbered 46.01 – 46.12 and 46.13 – 46.20. They were designed to haul heavy coal trains on mountainous lines with gradients of about 2.67% (1 in 35.7) and more, and they coped with this hard task very well. Bulgarian railwaymen gave them nickname "Mother Bear" because they looked fat, clumsy and compact. These engines appear to be the most powerful steam locomotives in Europe. Two of them (46.03 of Zwillings and 46.13 of Drillings) are preserved. The Zwilling 46.03 has been restored to working order and made its maiden voyage on steam in May 2015.

Technical specifications:

References

12,2-12-4